Notocelia autolitha is a species of moth of the family Tortricidae. It is found in China (Tianjin, Hebei, Jilin, Heilongjiang, Zhejiang, Henan, Hubei, Hunan, Anhui, Fujian, Guangdong, Sichuan, Guizhou, Shaanxi, Gansu), Korea and Japan.

The wingspan is 13.5–17 mm.

The larvae feed on Tachilus thunbergii.

References

Moths described in 1931
Eucosmini